Common names: banded rock rattlesnake, green rattlesnake, green rock rattlesnake, more.

Crotalus lepidus klauberi is a venomous pitviper subspecies endemic to the southwestern United States and adjacent northern Mexico.

Geographic range
In the United States C. l. klauberi is found in Arizona, New Mexico and Texas.

In Mexico it is found in the Mexican states of Baja California, Chihuahua, Coahuila, Durango, Jalisco, Nuevo León, San Luis Potosí, Sonora, Tamaulipas, and Zacatecas.

Etymology
The specific name or epithet, klauberi, is in honor of American herpetologist and rattlesnake expert Laurence M. Klauber.

Description

The color pattern is typically a light grey with darker grey banding that varies greatly from habitat to habitat. The background color may be green to purple in some locations. Those found in the Franklin Mountain range of El Paso County in Texas are unique, having a striking pearl silver background and well defined black crossbands.

The characters used to distinguish the various subspecies have been a point of contention for many years. Various sources have used scale counts, number of bands, the stripe along the eye region and the amount of mottling between bands as methods to tell them apart. Unfortunately, research has shown that there are always exceptions. It is generally accepted, however, that C. l. klauberi lacks mottling between the darker bands, even though this is not an entirely reliable method. It is not known whether the subspecies intergrade in the areas where their ranges overlap.

Common names
Banded rock rattlesnake, blue rattlesnake, green rattlesnake, green rock rattlesnake, rock rattlesnake.

Behavior
These are nocturnal, secretive snakes. They spend most of their time hiding in rock crevices. Often found in canyons, scree slopes, or man-made road cuts. Research has shown that they do not typically travel far, and often spend their entire lives on one particular slope or ridge. Their diet consists of primarily lizards and rodents. They are quite shy snakes, often not even rattling if approached, relying instead on their camouflage to blend into the rocky habitat. They are most likely to be seen after a summer afternoon thunderstorm, or rain shower, when they come out to bask and search for food.

In contrast to the shyness described above, Banded Rock Rattlesnake specimens found high (>7000 ft) in the Organ Mountains of southern New Mexico are usually highly confident and defensive, rattling incessantly at the mere sight of humans. One often has to search carefully for the source of the rattling, because they are indeed expert at hiding themselves in small caves and cracks in rocky terrain.

Reproduction
Ovoviviparous, with females giving birth to 2-8 young in the spring. Mating occurs in the summer months, after which gravid females hibernate during the winter months.

References

Further reading

 Klauber LM. 1997. Rattlesnakes: Their Habitats, Life Histories, and Influence on Mankind. Second Edition. 2 volumes. Reprint. Berkeley: University of California Press. .

External links
 
 Crotalus lepidus at University of Texas. Accessed 12 December 2007.
 Banded rock rattlesnake at American Int'l Rattlesnake Museum. Accessed 12 December 2007.

lepidus klauberi
Taxa named by Howard K. Gloyd
Reptiles described in 1936